The 1994 Exxon World Sports Car Championship and Supreme GT Series seasons were the 24th season of the IMSA GT Championship.  It was the first year for the new World Sports Car (WSC) class of open-cockpit prototypes in the premiere category, replacing the previous closed-cockpit GTP class.  Grand Tourer-style racing cars were also raced and ran in the GTS, GTO, and GTU classes.  It began February 5, 1994, and ended October 1, 1994, after nine rounds.

Schedule
Most races on the schedule had separate races for the WSC class and the GT classes, while longer events ran both classes at the same time. Races marked with All had all classes on track at the same time for the whole race.

Season results

† - The GTO class was combined with the GTS class for Daytona and Sebring.

Championship standings

WSC

GTS

GTO

GTU

External links
 World Sports Racing Prototypes - 1994 IMSA GT Championship standings

IMSA GT Championship seasons
IMSA GT